The Baghdad Clock is a public building located near the Green Zone, in Baghdad, Iraq. Prior to 2003 the building was employed as a museum and featured a large clock tower. However, the building was heavily damaged during the 2003 invasion of Iraq. It was reconstructed later and is now the seat of the Supreme Court of Iraq.

Towers in Iraq
Buildings and structures in Baghdad